Trilateral Progression is the fourth studio album by Canadian death metal band Neuraxis. It was released on September 13, 2005, by Earache Records in the United Kingdom, and by Willowtip Records in North America.

Track listing

Personnel

Neuraxis
 Ian Campbell – vocals
 Steven Henry – guitar
 Robin Milley – guitar, 12-string acoustic guitar
 Yan Thiel – bass
 Tommy McKinnon – drums

Additional musicians
 Guillaume Audet – music on "Introspect", intro and outro on "The Apex"
 Patrick Loisel – backing vocals on "Thought Adjuster"
 Jason Netherton – backing vocals on "Thought Adjuster", "Shatter the Wisdom", "Caricature"
 Maynard Moore – backing vocals on "Thought Adjuster", "Caricature"
 Alexandre Erian – backing vocals on "Shatter the Wisdom", "Monitoring the Mind", "Caricature", "The Apex"

Production
 Jason Suecof – mixing
 Scott Hull – mastering
 Yannick St-Amand – engineering
 Tony Fortin – assistant engineering
 Carlos "C Man" – assistant engineering

Additional personnel
 Sam Dufour – lyric revision
 Robin Milley – lyric revision
 Mike Harrison – artwork
 Mark Riddick – graphic execution
 Gab.357 – logo design
 Melany Champagne – band photo

References

2005 albums
Neuraxis (band) albums
Galy Records albums
Willowtip Records albums